The Dormy Open is a golf tournament on the Challenge Tour. It was first played in 2021 on the Öster by Stenson course at Österåker Golf Club in Åkersberga, Sweden, 20 km north-east of Stockholm. It was the last of two Challenge Tour events held in Sweden in May 2021.

Winners

Notes

References

External links
Coverage on the Challenge Tour's official site

Challenge Tour events
Golf tournaments in Sweden
Recurring sporting events established in 2021